Sir Alexander Maxwell, 2nd Baronet (died 23 May 1730) of Monreith, Wigtown, was a Scottish Member of Parliament (MP) in the British House of Commons.

He was born the eldest surviving son of Sir William Maxwell, 1st Bt., of Monreith and educated at the University of Glasgow. He became an advocate in 1705 and succeeded his father as 2nd Baronet and to the Monreith estate in April 1709.

He represented Wigtown Burghs in Parliament in 1713–1715.

He married Jean Montgomerie, daughter of The Earl of Eglinton by his first wife Margaret Cochrane and had 3 sons and 4 daughters. He was succeeded by his eldest son William, who was the father of Jane, the wife of The Duke of Gordon.

References

Year of birth missing
1730 deaths
Alumni of the University of Glasgow
Maxwell, Alexander, 2nd Baronet
Members of the Parliament of Great Britain for Scottish constituencies
British MPs 1713–1715